Tarentola mauritanica, known as the common wall gecko, is a species of gecko (Gekkota) native to the western Mediterranean area of North Africa and Europe. It has been introduced to Madeira and Balearic Islands, and the Americas (in Montevideo, Buenos Aires and California). A nocturnal animal with a predominantly insectivorous diet, it is commonly observed on walls in urban environments in warm coastal areas; it can be found further inland, especially in Spain where it has a tradition of cohabitation with humans as an insect hunter.

The species was first described by Carl Linnaeus in 1758. It is also known as moorish gecko, crocodile gecko, European common gecko, and, regionally, as osga (in Portuguese), salamanquesa (in Spanish) and dragó (in Catalan).

Description
Robust body and flat head. Back, legs and tail with prominent conic tubercles. Its regenerated tail is smoother and doesn't have tubercles. Obtuse mouth, big eyes with no eyelids and vertical pupil. Fingers with big lateral growths and adherent division less laminae in the bottom face. Only the third and fourth fingers end in union. Brownish grey or brown coloration with darker or lighter spots. These colours change in intensity according to the light. When they are active by day their colour is darker than during the night. It can be found on many construction sites, ruins, rock fields, tree trunks, etc.

Distribution
In Europe it can be found through most of the Iberian Peninsula (except northwestern Portugal and most of northern Spain), southern France, coastal Italy, southern Slovenia, northern coastal Croatia and southwestern parts of Greece. In North Africa it ranges from northern Egypt, through northern Libya, northern and central Tunisia, and northern Algeria to most of Morocco and northwestern Western Sahara. There is an isolated introduced population in southern Western Sahara.

Biology 
Mainly nocturnal or crepuscular. Also active during the day, on sunny days at the end of the winter especially. They like to receive sunlight near their refuge. They hunt insects and in the warmer months of the year it can be found hunting nocturnal insects near light sources, street lamps, etc. They lay 2 almost-spherical eggs twice a year around April and June. Moorish geckos are slow to mature, taking 4 to 5 years in captivity.

The introduction of the species may impact on native fauna, by preying on frogs and smaller lizards. The adoption of this species as a pet has led to populations becoming established in Florida and elsewhere.

It is the host of Haemoproteus tarentolae, a protozoan species in the genus Haemoproteus, and Esther's gecko mite (Geckobia estherae), endemic to Malta.

Image gallery

See also 
 Lists
 List of reptiles of Europe
 List of reptiles of Metropolitan France
 List of amphibians and reptiles of Gibraltar
 List of reptiles of Italy
 List of reptiles of Spain
 List of reptiles of Morocco
 List of reptiles of North America
 List of reptiles of California

 other
 Fauna of Europe
 Wildlife of Algeria
 Amphibia in the 10th edition of Systema Naturae

References

External links 
Tarentola mauritanica page at gekkota.com

mauritanica
Lizards of Europe
Lizards of Asia
Reptiles described in 1758
Taxa named by Carl Linnaeus
Reptiles of the Canary Islands